This article is a list of diseases of sugarcane (Saccharum spp. hybrids).

Bacterial diseases

Fungal diseases

Miscellaneous diseases and disorders

Nematodes, parasitic

Viral diseases

Protozoan diseases

Phytoplasma diseases 

Phytoplasmas were previously known as 'mycoplasma-like organisms' (MLOs).

Unsure causal agent diseases 
 Ramu stunt disease, a disease widespread throughout Papua New Guinea, but not detected in Australia

References

External links 
 Common Names of Diseases: Sugarcane diseases, The American Phytopathological Society
 List of Sugarcane Diseases, Ikisan agricultural portal
 Diseases in Sugarcane, Sugarcane Handbook, University of Florida Institute of Food and Agricultural Sciences

 
Sugarcane